Johnson Zuze (born 1985) is a visual artist living and working in Harare, Zimbabwe.  His work is based on creating startling forms from often cast away material found in his native Chitungwiza, highlighting aspects of a consumption based community and societal ironies that are the fabric of township life.

Johnson Zuze is the recipient of multiple awards and nominations and has exhibited extensively at the National Gallery of Zimbabwe.

Awards and prizes
(Source: KooVha Gallery).
2014: Young artist prize Heritage Exhibition National gallery
2013: 1ST Prize in Sculpture  No Limits, 1st Floor Gallery Harare
2013: National Arts Merit Award Nominee
20l2: 1st Place, Mixed Media  Friendship through Sport Zimbabwe Olympic Committee
2011: National Arts Merit Award Nominee
2010: 3rd Prize Mixed Media   FACET Exhibition. Gallery Delta Harare
2010: 2nd Prize Kristen Davis Award
2010: National Arts Merit Award Nominee
2009: Special Mention Unity Exhibition. Gallery Delta Harare
2009: 3rd Prize Mixed Media   Walls, Gallery Delta Harare
2008: Special prize   Enriching Women Gallery Delta

Selected exhibitions
2014: Umoji, Koovha Gallery, Harare
2013: UNWTO: - Victoria Falls
2013: Redefinitions IV: -:   Gallery Delta Harare
2013: No Limits: -:  First Floor Gallery Harare
2013: Artists in the Stream IV: -:   Gallery Delta Harare
2012: Friendship Through Sport: -:   Zimbabwe Olympic Committee
2012: Summer Exhibition: -:  Gallery Delta
2012: A Tale of two Cities: -  National Gallery of Zimbabwe
2012: The Contenders: - Gallery Delta
2012: Family Tradition and Religion: - Gallery Delta
2012: Zivakwawakabva: - Dzimbanhete
2012: Artist in the Stream III: -:   gallery Delta
2011: Found Objects Clinic: -  Gallery Delta
2011: Freedom Revisited: -:  Gallery Delta
2011: Before The Dawn: - National Gallery, Mutare
2011: Peace of Art: -  Zimbabwe German Society
2011: Small Works: -   Domboramwari: Art Gallery Hre
2011: Artist in Stream II: -   Gallery Delta
2010: Live and Direct: -: :    National Gallery Harare
2010: Artist in Stream I: -: Gallery Delta
2009: Walls: - Gallery Delta
2009: Women the Second Sex: -  National Gallery Harare
2009: Summer Exhibition: -:  Gallery Delta   Harare
2009: F.A.C.T Zimbabwe White Gold: - National Gallery
2008: Enriching Women: - Gallery Delta Harare

References

1985 births
Living people